Lynn Nancy Rivers (born December 19, 1956) is an American politician and lawyer from Michigan. She served four terms in the United States House of Representatives from 1995 to 2003.

Early life and education
Rivers was born in Au Gres, Michigan, and graduated from Au Gres-Sims High School, Arenac County, in 1975. She was married the day after graduation, and had 2 children by age 21.

She received a B.A. in biological anthropology from the University of Michigan in 1987 and a J.D. from Wayne State University in 1992.

Career
She served as a trustee of the Ann Arbor board of education from 1984 to 1992. She was a member of the Michigan State House of Representatives between 1993 and 1994.

Rivers was elected as a Democrat from Michigan's 13th District to the United States House of Representatives for the 104th and to the three succeeding Congresses, serving from January 3, 1995, to January 3, 2003.

After Michigan lost a district in the United States 2000 Census reapportionment, much of her district was merged into a redrawn 15th District together with long-time incumbent John Dingell. Rivers challenged Dingell in the Democratic primary for the new 15th. However, running in a district that was over 65 percent new to her, she lost to Dingell by 18 points.

Immediately after leaving Congress, she taught Political Science at the University of Michigan and at Washtenaw Community College.

Political positions

Mental health
During her first US House run in 1994, Rivers spoke publicly about her long struggle with bipolar disorder. She was about 21 when she was diagnosed. While in Congress she spoke about her condition on the House floor, making her the first openly bipolar member of Congress. In 1998, the National Mental Health Association (NMHA) named her "Legislator of the Year."

See also
 Women in the United States House of Representatives

References

External links

 Rep. Lynn Rivers at GovTrack

1956 births
Living people
American women lawyers
Politicians from Ann Arbor, Michigan
University of Michigan alumni
University of Michigan faculty
Wayne State University Law School alumni
People with bipolar disorder
Female members of the United States House of Representatives
Women in Michigan politics
Democratic Party members of the Michigan House of Representatives
Democratic Party members of the United States House of Representatives from Michigan
Women state legislators in Michigan
School board members in Michigan
20th-century American politicians
20th-century American women politicians
21st-century American politicians
21st-century American women politicians
People from Arenac County, Michigan